Heidi Marie Petersen (born 22 March 1958) is a Norwegian businessperson.

She was educated with a Master of Science from the University of Trondheim. She was employed in Kværner Oil & Gas in 1988, moving to Rambøll Oil & Gas as managing director in 2000. She left in 2007, and is now an independent businesswoman.

She is the chair of Sandefjord Lufthavn AS and is a member of the boards of Aker Solutions, Norsk Hydro, Ocean Heavy Lift and Awilco Offshore.

References

1958 births
Living people
Norwegian University of Science and Technology alumni
Aker Group people
Norwegian women business executives
Norwegian chairpersons of corporations
Women corporate directors